The following is a timeline of the history of the city of Bolzano/Bozen in the Trentino-South Tyrol region of Italy.

Prior to 20th century

 14 BC - A military settlement called "Pons Drusi" is founded by Romans.
 679 - Settlement and region ruled by the Duke of Bavaria ("comes Baiuvariorum, quem illi gravionem dicunt, qui regebat Bauzanum et reliqua castella").
 769 - Tassilo III, Duke of Bavaria issues in Bolzano the foundation charter of the Innichen Abbey.
 996–1000 - Settlement called "in Pauzana valle, quae lingua Teutisca Pozana nuncupatur".
 1027 - Bozen county "given by the emperor Conrad II to the bishop of Trent."
 1170 - Likely birthplace nearby of Walther von der Vogelweide, a German lyrical poet.
 1170–80 ca. - The town is founded by the bishop of Trent.
 1195 - The town's parson Rudolf is mentioned.
 1237 - Franciscan Friary active.
 1272 -  (hospital) established.
 1363 - Habsburg Rudolf IV, Duke of Austria in power.
 1437 - The borough rights (Stadtrecht) issued.
 1442 - Town council established by King Frederick III.
 1443 and 1483 - Two great town fires destroy large parts of the inner city.
 1472 - The Bozner Stadtbuch (Liber civitatis) instituted by mayor Konrad Lerhueber as the towns official register of legal acts.
 1519 - The openwork spire of the Parish church (now Cathedral) finished by the stonemasons Burkhard Engelberg and Hans Lutz von Schussenried.
 1551 - The Bozner Bürgerbuch, a register of the new citizens, instituted.
 1635 -  established.
 1805 - Town becomes part of the Kingdom of Bavaria, first Civic Theatre established.
 1810 - Town becomes part of French client Kingdom of Italy.
 1813 - Town becomes part of Austria again.
 1837 - Population: 10,499.(de)
 1842 -  newspaper begins publication.
 1859 - Brenner Railway (Verona-Bozen) begins operating; Bozen railway station opens.
 1861 - 10 November:  held.
 1862 -  (sport club) formed.
 1867 - Brenner Railway (Innsbruck-Bozen) begins operating.
 1874 -  (Austro-Hungarian war cemetery) established.
 1882 - Der Tiroler newspaper begins publication.
 1894 -  newspaper begins publication.
 1895 - Julius Perathoner becomes mayor.
 1898 - Überetsch Railway begins operating.
 1900 - Population: 23,521.(de)

20th century

 1907 -  (funicular) and Rittnerbahn (railway) begin operating.
 1909 - Bolzano Tramway begins operating.
 1912 -  (funicular) begins operating.
 1915 - Tiroler Soldaten-Zeitung newspaper begins publication.
 1918
 The new Civic Theatre (Stadttheater) opens.
 Italian forces take South Tyrol region during World War I and rename it as "Alto Adige"
 1921 - 24 April: Fascist unrest (Bloody Sunday).
 1922 - October: Fascist  occurs.
 1923
 Bolzano becomes part of the Province of Trento.
 Italianization of South Tyrol begins.
 1925 -  becomes part of Bolzano.
 1926
 Bolzano Airport opens.
 Dolomiten newspaper in publication.
 1927 - The Province of Bolzano established and separated from the Trento Province.
 1928 - The Fascist Bolzano Victory Monument inaugurated.
 1930 - Stadio Druso (stadium) opens.
 1931 - Associazione Calcio Bolzano (football club) formed.
 1933 - HC Bolzano (ice hockey club) formed. 
 1936 - Population: 45,505.(de)
 1936 - The today's Corso della Libertà-Freiheitsstraße (Liberty Avenue), a major civic boulevard adorned by buildings in monumentalist style, has been created by the fascist regime (then called Corso IX Maggio).
 1939–40 - The South Tyrol Option Agreement leads to the emigration of parts of the german-speaking population into the Third Reich.
 1939–42 - The local Casa del Fascio built displaying a monumental Mussolini basrelief, recontextualized in 2017.
 1943
 September: South Tyrol region annexed by Germany; Bolzano becomes part of the Nazi German Operationszone Alpenvorland (district).
 Bombing of Bolzano.
 1944 - Bolzano Transit Camp begins operating.
 1945 - Town liberated by allied forces from the nazifascist occupational forces on May 4
 December: "Official sanction of the German language" begins.
 South Tyrolean People's Party headquartered in Bolzano.
 Dolomiten and Alto Adige newspapers begin publication.
 1948
 Bolzano becomes part of the newly formed Trentino-Alto Adige province.
 November: Trentino-Alto Adige/Südtirol regional election, 1948 held.
 Bolzano Tramway closes.
 1950 -  (theatre) founded.
 1951 - Population: 70,898.(de)
 1960 - Rai Südtirol (radio) begins broadcasting.
 1961 - Night of fire happened.
 1964 - Roman Catholic Diocese of Bolzano-Brixen established.
 1966 - Rai Südtirol (TV channel) begins broadcasting.
 1967 - Haus der Kultur „Walther von der Vogelweide“ (Waltherhaus), a theatre and culture venue inaugurated.
 1968 -  becomes mayor.
 1971 - Population: 105,757.(de)
 1974 - F.C. Südtirol (football club) formed.
 1977 - Radio Tandem begins broadcasting.
 1985 - Museion - Museo d'Arte Moderna (museum) founded.
 1988 - Mattino dell'Alto Adige newspaper begins publication.
 1992 - Eurac Research (European Academy Bozen-Bolzano), a transdisciplinary research centre, founded.
 1995
  becomes mayor.
 Regional Civic Network of South Tyrol (website) launched.
 1996
 Neue Südtiroler Tageszeitung (newspaper) begins publication.
 F.C. Bolzano 1996 (football club) formed.
 1997 - Free University of Bozen-Bolzano founded.
 1998
 South Tyrol Museum of Archaeology established.
  opens.
 1999 -  (theatre) opens.

21st century

 2003 -  newspaper begins publication.
 2005 - Luigi Spagnolli becomes mayor.
 2008 - New Museion (museum) building opens.
 2013
 October: Trentino-Alto Adige/Südtirol provincial elections held.
 University's  (regional history institute) founded.
 Population: 103,891.
 2014 - BZ ’18–’45: one monument, one city, two dictatorships, a permanent exhibition within the fascist Monument to Victory is inaugurated.
 2015 - The so-called Stolpersteine, Holocaust victims commemorative markers, are laid out.
 2016 -  held; Renzo Caramaschi becomes mayor.
 2017 - The former Casa del Fascio historicized.
 2018 - NOI Techpark Südtirol/Alto Adige, a large science and technology park within the former industrial zone, opens.
 2019 - WaltherPark, a large urban renewal project designed by David Chipperfield starts.
 2021 - The town is granted the annual City of Memory status by the Interior Ministry.

See also
 Bolzano history
 
 List of mayors of Bolzano
 Civic Archives in Bozen-Bolzano (city archives)
 
  (Holocaust victims commemorative markers)
 History of South Tyrol region
 Raetia, ancient Roman province of which Bauzanum was part

Timelines of other cities in the macroregion of Northeast Italy:(it)
 Emilia-Romagna region: Timeline of Bologna; Ferrara; Forlì; Modena; Parma; Piacenza; Ravenna; Reggio Emilia; Rimini
 Friuli-Venezia Giulia region: Timeline of Trieste
 Trentino-South Tyrol region: Timeline of Trento
 Veneto region: Timeline of Padua; Treviso; Venice; Verona, Vicenza

References

This article incorporates information from the Italian Wikipedia and German Wikipedia.

Bibliography

in English

in German

  (written in 14th century)

in Italian

External links

 Items related to Bolzano, various dates (via Europeana)
 Items related to Bolzano, various dates (via Digital Public Library of America)

Bolzano
Bolzano
bolzano